The Sudden Wealth of the Poor People of Kombach is a film d'auteur from 1971 directed by Volker Schlöndorff.  He also co-wrote the script with Margarethe von Trotta.  The film was based on a true event that occurred in the Hessian Hinterland in the 19th century.

Plot 
On 19 May 1822, eight poor farmers and day laborers from Kombach in the Hessian Hinterland succeed in robbing a money transport that runs from Gladenbach to Gießen every month.  Their good fortune, however, does not last, as their sudden wealth is soon treated with suspicion.

Background 
The film is based on the Mail Robbery of Subach (de).  Schlöndorff, who grew up in Wiesbaden, used many references to his childhood in Hesse, including shooting at difference locations in Hesse, using Hessian actors, and referencing Hessian authors.

Awards 
1971:  Deutscher Filmpreis - Best Direction

1971:  San Sebastián International Film Festival - OCIC Award

External links 

 Der plötzliche Reichtum der armen Leute von Kombach, from the Internet Movie Database
 Der plötzliche Reichtum der armen Leute von Kombach, from Filmportal.de

References 

 "THE SUDDEN WEALTH OF THE POOR PEOPLE OF KOMBACH (DE 1971) – Sammlung Volker Schlöndorff". Retrieved 2020-05-31. 
 "Kasseler Grimm-Professur mit Volker Schlöndorff". archive.vn. (in German) 2012-09-07. Retrieved 2020-05-31.

1971 films
1971 drama films
1970s historical drama films
German historical drama films
West German films
1970s German-language films
Films directed by Volker Schlöndorff
German television films
Films set in the 1820s
1970s German films
Das Erste original programming